Govind Armstrong is an American chef who specializes in California cuisine. He has appeared on the Bravo series Top Chef as a guest judge as well as the Food Network series Iron Chef America as a contestant. He is also the author of the cookbook Small Bites, Big Nights: Seductive Little Plates for Intimate Occasions and Lavish Parties.

Early life
Armstrong grew up  Encino, California (in a home originally owned by F. Scott Fitzgerald) with one older brother, an older sister, and two younger sisters.  His mother is from Costa Rica, his father was African American, and his grandfather was from India.

Career

Armstrong began his culinary training at the age of 13 at Wolfgang Puck's Spago restaurant in West Hollywood. He also worked under Mark Peel of Campanile in Los Angeles, and Juan Mari Arzak of Arzak in San Sebastián, Spain.

Currently, Armstrong is the chef and co-owner of Post & Beam restaurant in Los Angeles.

Restaurants

 Post & Beamin Los Angeles
  8 Oz. Although the Los Angeles and Miami locations are closed, there are 8 Oz. Burger Bars in Seattle, and within Horseshoe Casinos in Mississippi and Louisiana.

References

External links

Review of Table 8 from the New York Times
8 Oz. Burger Bar

Living people
People from Encino, Los Angeles
African-American chefs
Asian American chefs
American television chefs
American cookbook writers
Iron Chef contestants
Chefs from California
21st-century American male writers
21st-century American non-fiction writers
American people of Costa Rican descent
People from Inglewood, California
American people of Indian descent
American people of African descent
1969 births
Chefs from Los Angeles